Snooker world rankings 1996/1997: The professional world rankings for the top 64 snooker players in the 1996–97 season are listed below.

References

1996
Rankings 1997
Rankings 1996